West Indian iguana may refer to:

The Lesser Antillean Iguana (Iguana delicatissima)
Members of the genus Cyclura, more commonly called rock iguanas.

Animal common name disambiguation pages